1404 Ajax  is a carbonaceous Jupiter trojan from the Greek camp, approximately  kilometers in diameter. It was discovered on 17 August 1936, by German astronomer Karl Reinmuth at Heidelberg Observatory in southern Germany, and named after the legendary warrior Ajax from Greek mythology. The assumed C-type asteroid belongs to the 40 largest Jupiter trojans and has a longer than average rotation period of 29.4 hours.

Orbit and classification 

Ajax is a C-type asteroid, that orbits in the leading Greek camp at Jupiter's  Lagrangian point, 60° ahead of its orbit (see Trojans in astronomy). It is also a non-family asteroid in the Jovian background population. Jupiter trojans are thought to have been captured into their orbits during or shortly after the early stages of the formation of the Solar System. More than 4,500 Jupiter trojans in the Greek camp and 7,000 in total have been discovered.

It orbits the Sun at a distance of 4.7–5.9 AU once every 12 years and 3 months (4,459 days; semi-major axis of 5.3 AU). Its orbit has an eccentricity of 0.11 and an inclination of 18° with respect to the ecliptic. The body's observation arc begins at Heidelberg 6 days after its official discovery observations in August 1936.

Physical characteristics 

Ajax is an assumed, carbonaceous C-type asteroid, while its V–I color index of 0.96 agrees with most D-type asteroids, which is the dominant spectral type among the large Jupiter trojans.

Rotation period 

In December 2010, a rotational lightcurve of Ajax was obtained from photometric observations taken by Robert Stephens at the Goat Mountain Astronomical Research Station  in California. Lightcurve analysis gave a rotation period of 29.38 hours with a brightness variation of 0.30 magnitude, superseding fragmentary photometric measurements by Richard P. Binzel (1988), and by Roberto Crippa and Federico Manzini (2009) at the Sozzago Astronomical Station , which gave a period of 28.4 and 34 hours, respectively.

Diameter and albedo 

According to the surveys carried out by the Infrared Astronomical Satellite IRAS, the Japanese Akari satellite and the NEOWISE mission of NASA's Wide-field Infrared Survey Explorer, Ajax measures between 81.69 and 96.34 kilometers in diameter and its surface has an albedo between 0.048 and 0.0665. The Collaborative Asteroid Lightcurve Link derives an albedo of 0.0508 and a diameter of 81.43 kilometers based on an absolute magnitude of 9.3.

Naming 

This minor planet was named for Ajax the Great, a Greek warrior of great strength and courage in the Trojan War. He is the half brother of Teucer and son of king Telamon, who kills himself because Achilles armor was awarded to Odysseus. The official naming of Ajax was first cited in The Names of the Minor Planets by Paul Herget in 1955.

References

External links 
 Asteroid Lightcurve Database (LCDB), query form (info )
 Dictionary of Minor Planet Names, Google books
 Asteroids and comets rotation curves, CdR – Observatoire de Genève, Raoul Behrend
 Discovery Circumstances: Numbered Minor Planets (1)-(5000) – Minor Planet Center
 
 

001404
Discoveries by Karl Wilhelm Reinmuth
Named minor planets
19360817